Fəxralı (also, Fakhraly) is a village and municipality in the Goranboy Rayon of Azerbaijan.  It has a population of 2,710 2009 year).

References 

Populated places in Goranboy District